Kunin, feminine: Kunina is a Slavic surname. Notable people with this surname include:

Drew Kunin, sound mixer 
Julia Kunin, American sculpture and video artist
Luke Kunin (born 1997), American ice hockey player
Madeleine M. Kunin, American diplomat, author, and politician
Myron Kunin (1928 - 2013), American businessman and art collector
Vitaly Kunin (born 1983) is a German chess player
Vladimir Kunin, Russian writer, playwright and screenwriter

See also

Slavic-language surnames